Abdullah may refer to:

 Abdullah (name), a list of people with the given name or surname
 Abdullah, Kargı, Turkey, a village
 Abdullah (film), a 1980 Bollywood film directed by Sanjay Khan
 Abdullah: The Final Witness, a 2015 Pakistani drama film
 Abdullah (band), an American metal band
 Abdullah (horse) (1970–2000), a horse that competed in the sport of show jumping

See also
 Abdalla people, an ethnic group in Kenya
 Abdollah (disambiguation)